St Luke's Church is an active Anglican church in the suburb of Skerton in Lancaster, Lancashire, England. It is a grade II listed building. It was built in 1833 as the parish church of Skerton which was at the time a township in the hundred of Lonsdale. Skerton became part of the City of Lancaster in 1974. Skerton now forms a suburb of Lancaster.

References

Lancaster
Lancaster
Churches in Lancaster, Lancashire
19th-century Church of England church buildings
1833 establishments in England